The women's team pursuit speed skating competition of the 2014 Sochi Olympics was held at Adler Arena Skating Center on 21 and 22 February 2014. The distance was 2,400 metres.

Qualification
A total of eight teams of three or four speed skaters could qualify for this team event. The top 6 of the 2013–14 ISU Speed Skating World Cup – Women's team pursuit standings after the World Cup race in Berlin secured a spot in the Olympics. Of the teams outside the top six, the United States and Norway qualified based on the time ranking. Russia would still have qualified as hosts if they had failed to make the list, but their sixth place in the World Cup standings secured a spot outright. A reserve list was also made.

Records
Prior to this competition, the existing world and Olympic records were as follows.

At the 2013 World Single Distance Speed Skating Championships the track record was at 3:00.02 by the team of the Netherlands consisting of Marrit Leenstra, Diane Valkenburg, and Ireen Wüst.

The following records were set during this competition.

OR = Olympic record, TR = track record

Results

Bracket

Quarterfinals
The quarterfinals were held on 21 February.

OR = Olympic record, TR = track record

Semifinals
The semifinals were held on 22 February.

OR = Olympic record, TR = track record

Finals
The finals were held on 22 February.

OR = Olympic record, TR = track record

References

Women's speed skating at the 2014 Winter Olympics